Zhijin County is a county under the administration of the prefecture-level city of Bijie in west-central Guizhou province, China.

History
Zhijin has been inhabited since the Qin, populated mainly by the Gelao. After the Jin, the Yi moved in. During the Kangxi Era of the Qing, a city was founded named Pingyuan. In 1914, it was renamed Zhijin after one of its streets.

Geography
Zhijin County is located in the southeastern part of Bijie City, roughly in the middle of Guizhou province. It is 151 km from Guiyang, 95 km from Anshun, 129 km from Bijie City. It spans 82.5 km from East to West, and 66 km from North to South.

Karst topography dominates the landscape, with caves everywhere. The Zhijin Cave 22 km from the county seat is considered the most magnificent cave in China, and is a popular tourist spot.

The highest point in the county has altitude 2262 m, and the lowest 1319 m.

Climate
The average temperature is 14.31 c, with annual rainfall 1356 mm.

Economy
The most important industry is tourism, with Zhijin Cave the number one attraction drawing tourists from all over China and the world.

Culture

Demographics
There are 23 ethnic groups living in Zhijin, including Han Chinese, Miao, Yi, Hui and Buyei. 48.02％ of Zhijin's population are considered minorities in China.

Administration
There are 11 towns and 21 townships in the county. Among them are:
Banqiao township

References

External links
Brief information about Zhijin County (in Chinese)
Local Government website (in Chinese)
Popular local forum(in Chinese)

County-level divisions of Guizhou
Bijie